Poggio a Caiano is a town and comune in the province of Prato, Tuscany region Italy.

Sister towns
Poggio a Caiano has two sister cities:

 Charlottesville, Virginia
 Agounit, Sahrawi Arab Democratic Republic

Main sights

The Medici villa

In 1473, a ruined fortified house at Poggio a Caiano called the Ambra, and land and a mill owned by Giovanni di Paolo Rucellai, were bought by Lorenzo de' Medici. Initially, only agricultural improvements were carried out; then in 1485, work began on the villa itself, to designs by Giuliano da Sangallo, who created a large fortified, quadrangular country house built around a central courtyard. A large central hall gave access to rooms with windows overlooking the surrounding countryside; at the time, this design was innovative.

On Lorenzo’s death in 1492, the villa was still largely unfinished; however, work resumed under Lorenzo’s second son, Giovanni, who became pope as Leo X. The central hall is named after this first Medici pope.

In the following century, the Villa di Poggio a Caiano was used by successive Medici Grand Dukes of Tuscany. In 1587, Bianca Cappello and Francesco I de' Medici, Grand Duke of Tuscany died there within a day of one another after short illnesses; raising the still unsolved question of their poisoning by Francesco’s brother Ferdinand, who succeeded Francesco as Ferdinando I de' Medici, Grand Duke of Tuscany. In the 17th and 18th centuries, the architects Giuseppe and Giovan Battista Ruggeri and Antonio Maria Ferri extended the villa. Major improvements to the gardens were also carried out after it came into the ownership of Maria Luisa, Queen of Etruria.

Following the Italian unification, the villa was refurbished and used by Victor Emmanuel II of Italy. The villa was donated to the Italian state in 1919. After a long period of neglect it became a national museum in 1984 and since that date has undergone restoration. It is now open to the public.

The main attractions of the villa are the Pontormo frescoes depicting Vertumnus and Pomona in the main salon. Most of the interior has lost its original furnishings, but these are being recreated to return the villa to the state described in a 1911 inventory, when it was a residence of the Savoyard. The formal gardens, now somewhat wild, slope down to the Ombrone at the rear of the villa. Poggio also contains in the North East corner of the formal garden Cosimo I's tennis court (1543) intact but no longer in use. The palatoia (as the court was referred to in Tuscany – elsewhere known as "pallacorda") was built for Cosimo I at the same time as his court at Palazzo Pitti. The "tennis" of the Italian Renaissance was hugely popular at court and in the streets as in France where the sport is known as "jeu de paume". "Real tennis" (as it is called today), which requires a customised court with elaborate interior playing surfaces, is the model for modern tennis although the sport played in the Renaissance continues to be played today with 46 active courts in France, Australia, the UK and USA.

The villa was featured in the 1965 John Schlesinger film Darling.

Churches
Santa Maria del Rosario in Poggio a Caiano
Church at the Institute of Minim Sisters in Poggio a Caiano
Parish church in Poggetto
Chapel at Villa Castellaccio
San Francesco in Bonistallo
Santa Maria in Bonistallo
Santa Cristina in Santa Cristina in Pilli
Diana's temple at Medici Villa in Poggio a Caiano

Villas

Medici Villa in Poggio a Caiano
Villa Cirri in Poggio a Caiano
Villa Pacetti in Poggio a Caiano
Villa Il Cerretino in Il Cerretino
Villa Il Poggiale in Il Poggiale
Villa Il Castellaccio in Madonna del Violo
Villa Magra in Madonna del Violo
Villa Mastringalla in Poggetto

Other sights
Medici Park in Poggetto
Old palace with tower in Santa Cristina in Pilli
Birthplace of Philip Mazzei in Poggio a Caiano
Bacco's fountain in Poggio a Caiano
Town hall in Poggio a Caiano
Medici Stables in Poggio a Caiano

Feasts
Siege at the Villa in Poggio a Caiano, held in  September 
Antique fair in Poggio a Caiano
Festival delle Colline, held in the whole province of Prato

References

External links

Official tourism website 
arttrav Medici Villa Poggio a Caiano information from arttrav.com
Museums in Florence - The Medici Villa of Poggio A Caiano

Cities and towns in Tuscany